Jan Beijert (1928, Smilde - 23 November 2007, Delfzijl) was a Dutch politician, director and columnist.

See also
List of Dutch politicians

1928 births
2007 deaths
People from Midden-Drenthe
Labour Party (Netherlands) politicians
Dutch civil servants
Dutch corporate directors
Dutch columnists